The Bird Rock, part of the Waterhouse Island Group, is an uninhabited  granite islet situated in Banks Strait, part of Bass Strait, lying close to the north-eastern coast of Tasmania, Australia.

Other islands in the Waterhouse Group include Ninth, Tenth, Waterhouse, Little Waterhouse, Maclean, Baynes, Cygnet, Swan, Foster, Little Swan, St Helens and Paddys islands and George Rocks islet.

Fauna
Recorded breeding seabird species are little penguin, common diving-petrel, Pacific gull and Caspian tern.

See also

List of islands of Tasmania

References

Islands of North East Tasmania
Waterhouse Island group